Judith Spang (born April 24, 1946) is an American politician in the state of New Hampshire. She is a member of the New Hampshire House of Representatives, sitting as a Democrat from the Strafford 6 district, having been first elected in 1998.

After traveling to Italy during the coronavirus outbreak, she went to the State House to work with her committee and was told not to return to the complex for two weeks and to observe U.S. Center for Disease Control guidelines to self-quarantine.

References

1946 births
Living people
Democratic Party members of the New Hampshire House of Representatives
Women state legislators in New Hampshire
Politicians from Providence, Rhode Island
Bryn Mawr College alumni
University of New Hampshire alumni
People from Durham, New Hampshire
20th-century American women politicians
21st-century American women politicians
20th-century American politicians
21st-century American politicians